Alexander Polyakov may refer to:

 Alexander Dmitriyevich Polyakov (born 1959), Russian diplomat and ambassador
 Alexander Markovich Polyakov (born 1945), Russian physicist
 Alexander Polyakov (artist) (1801–1835), Russian painter, mainly known for his portraits
 Alexander Polyakov (politician) (born 1969), Russian politician